Grayson Bell (born 21 March 1997) is an Australian swimmer. He competed in the men's 50 metre breaststroke event at the 2018 FINA World Swimming Championships (25 m), in Hangzhou, China.

References

External links
 
 

1997 births
Living people
Australian male breaststroke swimmers
Place of birth missing (living people)
Swimmers at the 2014 Summer Youth Olympics
Competitors at the 2019 Summer Universiade
Swimmers at the 2022 Commonwealth Games
Commonwealth Games competitors for Australia
Medalists at the FINA World Swimming Championships (25 m)
21st-century Australian people